Chen Rong (ca. 1200–1266) was a Chinese painter and politician of the Southern Song Dynasty celebrated for his depictions of dragons. The  Nine Dragons handscroll in the Museum of Fine Arts, Boston, Massachusetts, United States, bearing a date of 1244, is attributed to Chen.   The Five Dragons handscroll in the Nelson-Atkins Museum of Art in Kansas City, Missouri, is also attributed to Chen Rong.  A longer version of the Five Dragons, also attributed to Chen Rong, is in the Tokyo National Museum.  The Eleven Dragons painting in the Smithsonian's National Museum of Asian Art was formerly attributed to Chen Rong, but now is assigned to the Ming Dynasty period.  In March 2017, the Six Dragons handscroll, attributed to Chen Rong, was sold by Osaka's Fujita Art Museum at Christie's for almost $49 million.

Gallery

References

1200 births
1266 deaths
13th-century Chinese painters
Painters from Jiangxi
Song dynasty painters
Song dynasty politicians from Jiangxi
Politicians from Fuzhou, Jiangxi